Ermesinda of Bigorre (Aragonese: Ermisenda de Bigorra), born Gerberga or Gisberga (1015 – 1 December 1049), was a Queen of Aragon, a daughter of Bernard-Roger, Count of Bigorre and his wife Garsenda, Heiress of Bigorre. She was a member of the House of Foix, the sister of Bernard II, Count of Bigorre, Roger I, Count of Foix, and perhaps of Stephanie who married García Sánchez III of Navarre.

Gerberga married on 22 August 1036 to King Ramiro I of Aragon. After her wedding Gerberga changed her name to Ermesinda. The couple were married for thirteen years, in which time her husband elevated himself from a vassal holding scattered lands around Jaca into a de facto ruler of pocket-kingdom spanning the former counties of Aragon, Sobrarbe and Ribagorza, and is thereby credited with being the first King of Aragon. They had the following children:
Sancho Ramírez (c. 1042 – 4 June 1094), succeeded his father
García, Bishop of Jaca (d. 17 July 1086)
Teresa (b. 1037), married William Bertrand of Provence, no issue
Sancha (d. 1097), possibly married firstly to Pons, Count of Toulouse, and secondly to Ermengol III, Count of Urgell
Urraca (d. 1077), a nun

All of Ermesinda's children lived to adulthood. She died on 1 December 1049 and she was buried at the Monastery of San Juan de la Peña. Her husband remarried four years later to Agnes.

References

|-

1015 births
1049 deaths
House of Foix
Aragonese queen consorts
House of Aragon
11th-century people from the Kingdom of Aragon
11th-century Spanish women
11th-century French people
11th-century French women